General Sir William Thwaites,  (9 June 1868 – 22 June 1947) was a British Army officer who served as commander of the British Army of the Rhine.

Early life and education
Thwaites was born in Kensington, the son of William Thwaites of Durham Villas. He was educated at Wellington College, Berkshire and at Heidelberg before passing into the Royal Military Academy, Woolwich.

Military career
Thwaites was commissioned into the Royal Artillery in 1887. He was promoted to lieutenant on 16 February 1890 and to captain on 10 October 1897. He served in the Second Boer War 1899–1900 as an Adjutant in 33rd Brigade Royal Field Artillery, and took part in operations in Natal in late 1899, including engagements at Rietfontein and Lombard′s Knop and the defence of Ladysmith. For his service he was mentioned in despatches. He was promoted to major on 20 August 1902.

He served in the First World War on the Western Front in France and Belgium, becoming commander of the 141st (5th London) Brigade in 1915. He was then made General Officer Commanding 46th (North Midland) Division in July 1916.

After the war Thwaites became Director of Military Intelligence at the War Office from 1918, and then Director of Military Operations and Intelligence from 1922. In 1923 he became General Officer Commanding 47th (2nd London) Division and in 1927 he was appointed General Officer Commanding-in-Chief British Army of the Rhine: he was the last person to hold this post until after the Second World War. He was Director General of the Territorial Army from 1931 to 1933 when he retired.

References

|-

|-

|-

1868 births
1947 deaths
British Army generals
People educated at Wellington College, Berkshire
Graduates of the Royal Military Academy, Woolwich
British Army generals of World War I
Royal Artillery officers
Knights Commander of the Order of the Bath
Knights Commander of the Order of St Michael and St George
People from Kensington
Military personnel from London